Sir Arthur Charles Lucas, 2nd Baronet (22 May 1853 – 14 June 1915) was an English first-class cricketer active 1871–81 who played for Middlesex and Surrey.

Birth
He was born the son of Sir Thomas Lucas, 1st Baronet in Lowestoft, whom he succeeded in 1902.

Career
He joined the British Army in the Engineering and Railway Volunteer Staff Corps, Royal Engineers, transferring as a Major to the regular Engineering and Railway Staff Corps in 1908. He was also a partner in the contract engineering firms of Lucas Brothers, Lucas and Aird, and John Aird and Company, and was actively associated with many of their major contracts, notably London Underground railways and docks, Hull and Barnsley railway and the Aswan Dam. He was additionally a director of the Hull and Barnsley Railway Company.

He served as a Justice of the Peace (JP) for both Middlesex and Suffolk.

Personal life
He married Agnes Jamieson, daughter of George Jamieson, on 8 November 1876. They had no children and he was succeeded in the baronetcy by his younger brother Sir Thomas Lucas, 4th Baronet.

He died on 14 June 1915 in Marylebone and is buried at Highgate Cemetery.

References

1853 births
1915 deaths
Burials at Highgate Cemetery
Baronets in the Baronetage of the United Kingdom
Engineer and Railway Staff Corps officers
English cricketers
Middlesex cricketers
Surrey cricketers
Gentlemen of Marylebone Cricket Club cricketers
Gentlemen of England cricketers
Vanity Fair (British magazine) people